Mrakovo (Moraq) is a rural locality (a selo) and the administrative centre of Mrakovsky Selsoviet, Gafuriysky District, Bashkortostan, Russia. The population was 634 as of 2010. There are 14 streets.

Geography 
Mrakovo is located 34 km southwest of Krasnousolsky (the district's administrative centre) by road. Novotroyevka is the nearest rural locality.

References 

Rural localities in Gafuriysky District